The Copa del Rey 2001-02 was the 66th edition of the Spanish basketball Cup. It was organized by the ACB and was held in Vitoria-Gasteiz at the Fernando Buesa Arena between 14 and 17 March 2002. The winning team was TAU Cerámica.

Brackett

Final

MVP of the Tournament:  Dejan Tomašević

See also
ACB
Copa del Rey de Baloncesto

External links
Results and stats of Copa del Rey 2002 

Copa del Rey de Baloncesto
2001–02 in Spanish basketball